A list of films produced in Spain in 1978 (see 1978 in film).

1978

References

External links
 Spanish films of 1978 at the Internet Movie Database

1978
Spanish
Films